Leptotrophon turritellatus is a species of sea snail, a marine gastropod mollusk in the family Muricidae, the murex snails or rock snails.

Description
The length of the shell attains 11.5 mm.

Distribution
This marine species occurs off New Caledonia at depths between 290 m and 305 m.

References

Muricidae
Gastropods described in 1995